Victory of Islam (Urdu: Fatah Islam) is the first in a series of three books by Mirza Ghulam Ahmad, the founder of the Ahmadiyya Movement, wherein he extensively sets out and explicates his claims; the others being Tauzīh-e-marām and Izāla Awhām. It was published in 1891 CE.

Subject

Having specified what he perceived as the diverse moral and religious corruption raging at the time and the prevalence of materialism, Ghulam Ahmad describes the efforts that the Christian missionaries  were making to convert Muslims to their own faith and the various measures employed by them against Islam. 
He then states that he has been raised by God in order to counter these 'evils', to revive the religion and establish it in the hearts of people.  Outlining his work, Ghulam Ahmad, in order for the reformation of mankind and to attract people towards ‘this Divine Dispensation’, has distributed its spheres of activities into five branches or departments which could be summarised as the following:
The writing and publication of books
The publication of posters and handbills in order to ‘establish the truth of the Islamic belief over other creeds.’
to cater for and offer spiritual assistance through speeches and discourse for visitors who ‘seek after truth’. Those who visit for further understanding and thereby derive benefit from the ‘Association of the Righteous’.
The writing of letters to people in different parts of the world.
To organise those who are initiated into the field and the widening of the circle of devotees.
After having discussed the logistical and financial aspects of his work, Ghulam Ahmad elaborates upon the sacrifices and zeal of the early Islamic community and of the companions of Muhammad. He appeals for assistance, stating that such fervour is needed in this age too and explains why it is essential for the Muslims to believe in him and assist him.

At the close of the book Ghulam Ahmad has made an announcement to the effect that all those who would like to ask any questions or who have any objections against Islam, the Qur'an and the prophet Muhammad, or against himself (Ghulam Ahmad) or his claims or the work that he is doing, should write to him and seriously and sincerely ask for his answers. He states in this announcement that he will publish their questions or objections with his answers in a book form.

See also

Writings of Mirza Ghulam Ahmad

References

External links
 Victory of Islam translated by Dr. Zahid Aziz
 Victory of Islam
 Introduction to the books of Mirza Ghulam Ahmad

Works by Mirza Ghulam Ahmad
1891 books
Islamic theology books
19th-century Indian books
Indian religious texts